Shakira January  is a South African water polo player, who is a member of the South Africa women's national water polo team. She was part of the team in the women's water polo tournament at the 2020 Summer Olympics.

She participated in the 2018 Pan Pacific Youth Water Polo Tournament, and 2019 FINA U20 Water Polo World Championship .

References 

Living people
South African female water polo players
Olympic water polo players of South Africa
Water polo players at the 2020 Summer Olympics
2002 births
21st-century South African women